Kfar Tab ( Kafrṭāb) was a diocese of the Syriac Orthodox Church near Apamea in Syria, attested in the eleventh and twelfth centuries.  Four of its bishops are mentioned in the lists of Michael the Syrian.

Sources 
The main primary source for the Syriac Orthodox bishops of Kfar Tab is the record of episcopal consecrations appended to Volume III of the Chronicle of the Syriac Orthodox patriarch Michael the Syrian (1166–99).  In this Appendix Michael listed most of the bishops consecrated by the Syriac Orthodox patriarchs of Antioch between the ninth and twelfth centuries.  Twenty-eight Syriac Orthodox patriarchs sat during this period, and in many cases Michael was able to list the names of the bishops consecrated during their reigns, their monasteries of origin, and the place where they were consecrated.

Bishops of Kfar Tab 
Four Jacobite bishops of Kfar Tab are mentioned in the lists of Michael the Syrian.

The diocese of Kfar Tab seems to have lapsed before the end of the twelfth century.

Notes

References 
 
 
 Jean-Baptiste Chabot, Chronique de Michel le Syrien, Patriarche Jacobite d'Antiche (1166-1199). Éditée pour la première fois et traduite en francais I-IV (1899;1901;1905;1910; a supplement to volume I containing an introduction to Michael and his work, corrections, and an index, was published in 1924. Reprinted in four volumes 1963, 2010).

Syriac Orthodox dioceses
Oriental Orthodoxy in Syria